A parish church (or parochial church) in Christianity is the church which acts as the religious centre of a parish. In many parts of the world, especially in rural areas, the parish church may play a significant role in community activities, often allowing its premises to be used for non-religious community events. The church building reflects this status, and there is considerable variety in the size and style of parish churches. Many villages in Europe have churches that date back to the Middle Ages, but all periods of architecture are represented.

Roman Catholic Church
Each diocese (administrative unit, headed by a Bishop) is divided into parishes. Normally, a parish comprises all Catholics living within its geographically defined area. Within a diocese, there can also be overlapping parishes for Catholics belonging to a particular rite, language, nationality, or community.

Each parish has its own central church called the parish church, where religious services take place. The parish church is the center of most Catholics' spiritual life since it is there that they receive the sacraments. On Sundays and perhaps also daily, Mass is celebrated by a priest resident in the parish. Confession is made available and perhaps Vespers in the larger or more progressive parishes. There are also laity-led activities and social events in accordance with local culture and circumstances.

Roman Catholics are not obliged to worship only at the parish church to which they belong, but they may for convenience or taste attend services at any Roman Catholic church. However, their parish church is the one to which the members of the parish must go for baptisms and weddings, unless permission is given by the parish priest (US 'pastor') for celebrating those sacraments elsewhere. One sign of that is that the parish church is the only one to have a baptismal font.

Some larger parishes or parishes that have been combined under one parish priest may have two or more such churches, or the parish may be responsible for chapels (or chapels of ease) located at some distance from the mother church for the convenience of distant parishioners.

Church of England and Church of Scotland
In England and many British Overseas Territories and former British territories, the Church of England parish church is the basic administrative unit of episcopal churches. Nearly every part of England is designated as a parish, there being both ecclesiastic parishes and civil parishes, which overlie each other, but since the nineteenth century have not shared the same names or boundaries (in other territories arrangements may differ, eg in Bermuda civil and church parishes still share the same boundaries, see Anglican Church of Bermuda). Most parishes have an Anglican parish church, which is consecrated. If there is no parish church, the bishop licenses another building for worship, and may designate it as a parish centre of worship. This  building is not consecrated, but is dedicated, and for most legal purposes it is deemed to be a parish church.  In areas of increasing secularisation or shifts in religious belief, centres of worship are becoming more common, and larger churches are sold due to their upkeep costs. Instead the church may use community centres or the facilities of a local church of another denomination.

While smaller villages may have a single parish church, larger towns may have a parish church and other smaller churches in various districts. These churches do not have the legal or religious status of 'parish church' and may be described by a variety of terms, such as chapel of ease or mission church. Often the parish church will be the only one to have a full-time minister, who will also serve any smaller churches within the parish. (For example, St. Peter's Church in St. George's Parish, Bermuda, is located on St. George's Island; Aachapel-of-ease (named simply Chapel-of-Ease) was erected on neighbouring St. David's Island so that the island's residents need not cross St. George's Harbour).

In cities without an Anglican cathedral, the parish church may have administrative functions similar to that of a cathedral. However, the diocese will still have a cathedral.

The Church of Scotland, the established Presbyterian church, also uses a system of parish churches, covering the whole of Scotland.

In American Protestantism
In Massachusetts, towns elected publicly funded parish churches from 1780 until 1834, under the Constitution of Massachusetts.

Protestant resurgence
Toward the end of the 20th century, a new resurgence in interest in "parish" churches emerged across the United States. This has given rise to efforts like the Slow Church Movement and The Parish Collective which focus heavily on localized involvement across work, home, and church life.

See also
Roman Catholic parish church
Church of England parish church

References

Types of Christian organization
Types of church buildings
Christian terminology